Rhyncholacis is a genus of flowering plants belonging to the family Podostemaceae.

Its native range is Southern Tropical America.

Species:

Rhyncholacis apiculata 
Rhyncholacis applanata 
Rhyncholacis brassicifolia 
Rhyncholacis brevistamina 
Rhyncholacis carinata 
Rhyncholacis clavigera 
Rhyncholacis coronata 
Rhyncholacis crassipes 
Rhyncholacis cristata 
Rhyncholacis dentata 
Rhyncholacis divaricata 
Rhyncholacis flagellifolia 
Rhyncholacis guyanensis 
Rhyncholacis hydrocichorium 
Rhyncholacis jenmanii 
Rhyncholacis linearis 
Rhyncholacis macrocarpa 
Rhyncholacis minima 
Rhyncholacis minor 
Rhyncholacis nitelloides 
Rhyncholacis nobilis 
Rhyncholacis oligandra 
Rhyncholacis palmettifolia 
Rhyncholacis paulana 
Rhyncholacis penicillata 
Rhyncholacis squamosa 
Rhyncholacis unguifera 
Rhyncholacis varians

References

Podostemaceae
Malpighiales genera